The following is a list of tenants of Jethou. Jethou is an island in the Channel Islands owned by the States of Guernsey. In 1416 AD, it became part of Henry V of England's estate, and remains a Crown lease.

List of tenants

References

Bibliography

Jethou tenants
Bailiwick of Guernsey